Khan Asparuh is a 1981 three-part Bulgarian historical action and drama film telling the story of Khan Asparuh and the events around the founding of the medieval Bulgarian state in 681 AD. It was shot and released on the occasion of the 1300th anniversary of Bulgaria. The film was selected as the Bulgarian entry for the Best Foreign Language Film at the 55th Academy Awards, but was not accepted as a nominee.

The director is Ludmil Staikov, with Stoyko Peev playing Asparuh, Antoniy Genov playing Velisarius and Vanya Tsvetkova Pagane.

In 1984 the film was internationally released as 681 AD: The Glory of Khan in a 92-minute English-language edited version, down from the original 4½ hours. The version has received much criticism for not presenting the entire plot well and focusing on certain aspects, thus changing the whole feel of the production.

Cast
 Stoyko Peev as Khan Asparukh of Bulgaria
 Antony Genov as Velisarius
 Vassil Mihajlov as Khan Kubrat
 Vania Tzvetkova as Pagane
 Stefan Getsov as The High Priest of Tangra
 Georgi Cherkelov as  Velisarius' father
 Iossif Surchadzhiev as Constantine IV

See also
 List of historical drama films
 List of submissions to the 55th Academy Awards for Best Foreign Language Film
 List of Bulgarian submissions for the Academy Award for Best Foreign Language Film

References

External links

1981 films
Films set in the 7th century
Films set in the Byzantine Empire
Films set in Bulgaria
1981 drama films
Films shot in Bulgaria
Bulgarian biographical drama films
Bulgarian historical drama films
1980s historical drama films
1980s biographical drama films
Cultural depictions of kings
Cultural depictions of Bulgarian men
Biographical films about royalty